Little Sioux can be the name of one of two places in Iowa, the United States:

 Little Sioux, Iowa, a small town in Harrison County
 The Little Sioux Scout Ranch, a Boy Scouts of America camp near the town.
 The Little Sioux River